Dewas State was a territory within Central India, which was the seat of two Maratha princely states during the British Raj.
After the Maratha conquest of Central India, Dewas was divided into two states - Dewas Junior ruled by Jivaji Rao ('Dada Saheb') Puar and Dewas Senior ruled by Tukoji Rao ('Baba Saheb') Puar. On 12 December 1818, the 2 Dewas States became British protectorates.

History

Foundation and being part of Maratha empire
The seats were established in 1728 by two brothers from the Maratha clan Puar, who advanced into Malwa with the Peshwa Baji Rao, and divided the territory among themselves after the Maratha conquest.  Their descendants ruled as the senior and junior branches of the family.

Princely states under British rule
After 1841, each branch ruled his own portion as a separate state, though the lands belonging to each were intimately entangled; in Dewas, the capital town, the two sides of the main street were under different administrations and had different arrangements for water supply and lighting.

The two Rajas heading Dewas states both lived in separate residences in the town of Dewas, and ruled over separate areas.

Both Dewas states were in the Malwa Agency of the Central India Agency.

Dewas Junior & Senior Darbars (Court) was composed of Sardars, Mankaris, Istamuradars, Thakurs and Jagirdars.

Accession to Indian Union
After India's independence in 1947, the Maharajas of Dewas acceded to India, and their states were integrated into Madhya Bharat, which became a state of India in 1950. In 1956, Madhya Bharat was merged into Madhya Pradesh state.

See also
Dhar State

References

Dhar district
Princely states of Madhya Pradesh
Princely states of Maharashtra
States and territories disestablished in 1948
1948 disestablishments in India
Dewas district
History of Madhya Pradesh
1728 establishments in Asia